SPU can stand for:

Government
 Seattle Public Utilities, a public utility agency
 Sheffield Political Union, a former organisation established to campaign for Parliamentary Reform
 Socialist Party of Ukraine, a political party
 Suomen Pyöräilyunioni, the Finnish governing body of cycling

Education

Organizations
 Saint Paul University System, Philippines
 Former US Student Peace Union

Universities
Saint Paul University in Ottawa, Ontario, Canada
Saint Peter's University in Jersey City, New Jersey
Sankalchand Patel University in Visnagar, Gujarat, India
Sardar Patel University in Vallabh Vidyanagar, Gujarat, India
Seattle Pacific University in Seattle, Washington, United States
Slobomir University in Slobomir, Republika Srpska, Bosnia and Herzegovina
Sol Plaatje University in Kimberley, Northern Cape, South Africa
Sripatum University in Chatuchak, Bangkok, Thailand
Sulaimani Polytechnic University in Sulaymaniyah, Kurdistan Region, Iraq
Syrian Private University in Damascus, Syria

Technology
 Synergistic Processing Unit in the Sony-IBM-Toshiba cell microprocessor

Transportation
 Split Airport, IATA airport code SPU
 Staplehurst railway station, National Rail code SPU